The 2022 Maui Invitational Tournament was an early-season college basketball tournament that was played for the 39th time. The tournament began in 1984 and will be part of the 2022–23 NCAA Division I men's basketball season.  The tournament returned to Maui, Hawaii for the first time since 2019 due to the COVID-19 pandemic.  The Championship Round featured the Arizona Wildcats &  Creighton Bluejays.  Arizona won their 3rd tournament title by a score of 81–79.  Oumar Ballo was the tournament MVP, averaging 21.0 points, 10.7 rebounds & shot 79.4% from the field.  The game was played at the Lahaina Civic Center in Maui from November 21 to 23, 2022.

Teams

Bracket

All Tournament Team
 Oumar Ballo (MVP) – Arizona
 Daniel Batcho – Texas Tech 
 Anthony Black – Arkansas
 Ryan Nembhard – Creighton
 Ąžuolas Tubelis – Arizona

References

Maui Invitational Tournament
Maui Invitational
2022 in sports in Hawaii
Maui Invitational Tournament